Agonizer may refer to:

Agonizer, a Finnish heavy metal band
 Agonizer, a device in "Mirror, Mirror" (Star Trek: The Original Series)
Agonizer, an Imperial Star Destroyer in Star Wars